Lisanne Freya de Roever (born 6 June 1979 in Amstelveen, North Holland) is a Dutch field hockey player who plays as a goalkeeper for Dutch club SV Kampong. She made her debut for the Netherlands national team on 5 March 2005 in a friendly match against Malaysia.

De Roever was a member of the Dutch squad that won the silver medal at the 2004 Summer Olympics in Athens. She was also part of the squad that became World Champion at the 2006 Women's Hockey World Cup and which won the 2007 Champions Trophy.

At the 2008 Summer Olympics in Beijing she won an Olympic gold medal with the Dutch national team beating China in the final 2–0.

References
  Dutch Olympic Committee

External links
 

1979 births
Living people
Dutch female field hockey players
Female field hockey goalkeepers
Field hockey players at the 2004 Summer Olympics
Field hockey players at the 2008 Summer Olympics
Medalists at the 2004 Summer Olympics
Medalists at the 2008 Summer Olympics
Olympic field hockey players of the Netherlands
Olympic gold medalists for the Netherlands
Olympic medalists in field hockey
Olympic silver medalists for the Netherlands
Sportspeople from Amstelveen
SV Kampong players
20th-century Dutch women
20th-century Dutch people
21st-century Dutch women